Sudeep Sahir is an Indian television actor known for his work in Kunal Ganjawala's music video "Channa Vey" and later in Saregama HMV's television serial Odhni. He is known for portraying Aditya Jindal in Woh Apna Sa, Krishna in Paramavatar Shri Krishna, and Rajeev Bansal in Tera Yaar Hoon Main.

Personal life
Sahir is married to writer Anantica Sahir and they have a son named Arwaann.

Selected filmography

Film

Television

References

External links
 

Living people
Indian male television actors
Indian male soap opera actors
Year of birth missing (living people)